Robin Ammerlaan was the defending champion, but he lost in the first round to Stefan Olsson, who lost in the semifinals to the winner of the tournament Stéphane Houdet. Houdet beat Ronald Vink in straight sets for the championship.

Seeds
 Stéphane Houdet (champion) 
 Maikel Scheffers (semifinal)

Draw

Finals

External links
 Main Draw

Wheelchair Singles
ABN AMRO World Tennis Tournament, 2010